Acianthera luteola is a species of orchid.

luteola
Plants described in 1841